Breon Mitchell (born Bert Breon Mitchell; 1942) is a retired American professor of Germanic Studies and translator. He was a  Professor of Germanic Studies, chair of the Comparative Literature Department, and Director of the Lilly Library of Indiana University. He has translated a number of notable German works into English including The Trial by Franz Kafka, The God of Impertinence by Sten Nadolny, Shadowlife by Martin Grzimek, The Silent Angel by Heinrich Böll, Laura's Skin by J.F. Federspiel, The Color of the Snow by Rüdiger Kremer, and The Tin Drum by Günter Grass (2009).
Mitchell translated and then revised What Must Be Said by Grass in April 2012.

Personal life
Breon Mitchell was born on August 9, 1942 in Salina, Kansas to John Charles II and Maxine Mitchell. He has a brother John Charles III and late brother Tim. He has three children with his wife Lynda: Catherine, Kieron, and Kerry. Breon lives in Ellettsville, Indiana. He retired from Indiana University in early 2013, and there received the President's Distinguished Service Medal award. He enjoys watching the Indianapolis Colts, guest lecturing around the world, talking to his granddaughters Maddie and Molly, and collecting rare books.

References

American translators
Germanists
Indiana University faculty
Living people
1942 births
Translators of Franz Kafka
German–English translators
20th-century translators